A Sexplanation is a 2021 American documentary film directed by and starring Alex Liu, a Chinese American independent filmmaker. Liu's film follows him traveling the United States and Canada to uncover what good sex education looks like. The film includes conversations with researchers and educators, including those at the Kinsey Institute, Planned Parenthood, and San Francisco Sex Information.

Release
A Sexplanation had its world premiere at the Cinequest Film & Creativity Festival from March 20–30, 2021  winning the Audience Award for Feature Documentary.

The film had its international premiere at the Inside Out LGBTQ Film Festival May 27-June 6, 2021 in Toronto, where it also won the Audience Award for Feature Documentary.

Reception

Critical Response 
A Sexplanation was a New York Times Critic's Pick with writer Claire Shaffer saying, "Liu lends a frankness and sensitivity to the topic that would make “A Sexplanation” suitable to be shown in a classroom..."

Phuong Le of The Guardian wrote, "Alex Liu makes for a charismatic guide to the sexual landscape of America, with an engaging curiosity to help demystify the birds and the bees... it sparkles with an engaging curiosity." 

Noel Murray from The Los Angeles Times described the film as "an entertaining movie with admirable intentions, pushing the audience to rethink their presumptions about pleasure."

Randy Myers of The Mercury News wrote, "[Liu] makes a charming guide ... Breezy and engaging."  KQED arts critic Michael Fox said "A Sexplanation is an irreverent, informative and disarming road trip ... and deserves to be disseminated as widely as possible."   Pat Mullen of POV Magazine wrote the movie was "Fun, informative, and sex-positive ... A Sexplanation unabashedly puts the "d" in doc."

Gary Kramer from Salon reviewed the film saying, "Alex Liu's smart, lively, and thoughtful documentary about sex education — both his in particular and America's in general. Liu's goal is to talk honestly and even vulnerably, about sex, and he covers topics ranging from masturbation and pornography to taboo fantasies to demystify sex and the shame often associated with it. It is through his discussions with his own parents, as well as sex educators and researchers — and even a Catholic priest — that he normalizes dialogue about a topic most folks would prefer not to discuss. 'A Sexplanation' is certainly a conversation starter, and like the numerous interviewees, the ingratiating Liu treats the topic respectfully, and with a healthy curiosity, which is why it is so gratifying."

On the review aggregator website Rotten Tomatoes, the film holds an approval rating of 100% based on 27 reviews.

Accolades

References

External links
 
 

2021 documentary films
2021 films
2021 LGBT-related films
American documentary films
American LGBT-related films
Sex education
2020s English-language films
2020s American films